Bosanski Petrovac is a town and municipality located in the Una-Sana Canton of the Federation of Bosnia and Herzegovina, an entity of Bosnia and Herzegovina. As of 2013 census, the municipality has a population of 7,328 inhabitants, while the town has a population of 3,427 inhabitants.

History

The settlement has existed since Roman times. It was conquered by the Ottoman Empire somewhere between 1520 and 1530. From 1929 to 1941, Bosanski Petrovac was part of the Vrbas Banovina of the Kingdom of Yugoslavia. During the Second World War, it was a Partisan stronghold which was conveniently located close to Marshal Josip Broz Tito's headquarters in Drvar. On 6 December 1942 the Women's Antifascist Front of Yugoslavia was established in the town.

During the 1992–95 Bosnian War, the town's Serb majority remained in the city while the Bosniaks and Croats were forced to leave their homes. Then in 1995, as the war was nearing its end, the Army of the Republic of Bosnia and Herzegovina seized Bosanski Petrovac and it remained in Bosnian hands until the end of the war. In the following years, the Serbs' right to return would be hindered. However, the town would eventually return to its pre-war ethnic composition.

Settlements

 Bara
 Bjelaj
 Bjelajski Vaganac
 Bosanski Petrovac
 Bravski Vaganac
 Brestovac
 Bukovača
 Bunara
 Busije
 Cimeše
 Dobro Selo
 Drinić
 Janjila
 Jasenovac
 Kapljuh
 Klenovac
 Kolunić
 Krnja Jela
 Krnjeuša
 Lastve
 Medeno Polje
 Oraško Brdo
 Oštrelj
 Podsrnetica
 Prkosi
 Rašinovac
 Revenik
 Risovac
 Skakavac
 Smoljana
 Suvaja
 Vedro Polje
 Vođenica
 Vranovina
 Vrtoče

Demographics

Population

Ethnic composition

Notable people
 Mersad Berber, painter
 Jovan Bijelić, painter
 Ahmet Hromadžić, writer
 Tomislav Krizmanić, boxer, bronze medal winner at the 1953 European amateur boxing championships
 Skender Kulenović, writer
 Marinko Rokvić, Serbian folk singer

References

External links

 Official site (in Bosnian)

 
Municipalities of the Una-Sana Canton
Serb communities in the Federation of Bosnia and Herzegovina